Uskside may refer to:
Along the River Usk in Wales
Uskside, a cargo ship, launched as Empire Warner
Uskside Foundry, a former foundry in Newport, Wales

See also
Usk (disambiguation)